Characters is a solo album by guitarist John Abercrombie that was recorded in 1977 and released by ECM in 1978.

Reception 
The AllMusic review by Robert Taylor gave the album 4 stars, stating, "Abercrombie makes excellent use of space within both his compositions and solos. Upon the first listen there may not appear to be very much here; however, this music needs to be absorbed over several listens to appreciate Abercrombie's brilliance."  The Penguin Guide to Jazz gave the album 3½ stars, stating, "Characters was Abercrombie's most overt manifesto and calling-card, a demonstration of styles and moods and, even at this point in his career, influences too." The Rolling Stone Jazz Record Guide said, "a tremendous solo display of Abercrombie's acoustic/electric guitar and mandolin playing".

Track listing

Personnel
 John Abercrombie – electric guitar, acoustic guitar, electric mandolin

References 

ECM Records albums
John Abercrombie (guitarist) albums
1978 albums
Albums produced by Manfred Eicher